The Amazigh (Berber) cuisine is a traditional cuisine with a varied history and influence of numerous flavours from distinct regions across North Africa. The traditional cuisine draws influences from Morocco's Atlas mountains and heavily populated Berber cities and regions, as well as Algeria's Berber cities and regions.

Berber cuisine differs from one area to another within North Africa and West Africa(Mauritania). For this reason, every dish has a distinct and unique identity and taste according to the specific region it originates from in North Africa, with some dishes estimated to be more than a thousand years old. Zayanes of the region of Khénifra around the Middle Atlas have a cuisine of a remarkable simplicity. It is based primarily on corn, barley, ewe's milk, goat cheese, butter, honey, meat, and game. Popular authentic Berber preparations of Tunisian, Moroccan, Algerian,  and Libyan, Mauritanian cuisine include tajine, couscous, shakshouka, pastilla, msemen, merguez, asida, lablabi, harissa, makroudh, harira, sfenj, and ahriche.

Foods and dishes

Berber foods and dishes include:

 Baghrir, a semolina pancake
 Bouchiar (fine wafer without yeast soaked with butter and natural honey)
 Bourjeje (pancake made containing flour, eggs, yeast and salt)
 Bread made with traditional yeast
 Couscous, a dish enjoyed worldwide
 Chakhchoukha, a Chaoui dish made of flatbread eaten on occasions
 Akanaf or lamb barbecue - a whole sheep roasted in artisanal ovens designed especially for this use. The sheep is coated with natural butter, which makes it tastier. This dish is mainly designed to be served at festivities.
 Merguez, a spicy sausage often made with lamb
  Mamita  A pan full of different kinds of vegetables, meat and spices
 Pastilla –
 Tajine, a very diversified dish, made in various forms:
Tajine with chicken, lemon and olives
Tajine with tuna
Tajine with sardines
Tajine with lamb meat and caramelized plum
Tajine with plums
Tajine with legumes and endives
Tajine with turkey and potatoes
 Tahricht (containing offal: brain, tripe, lung, heart; these ingredients are rolled up with the intestines on a stick of oak and cooked on embers)

Although they are the original inhabitants of North Africa, Berbers lived in very contained communities, in spite of various incursions by Phoenicians, Romans, Byzantines, Arabs, Ottomans and French. Having been subject to limited external influences, these populations lived free from factors making for acculturation.

Couscous and tajine are the principal dishes for special feasts and celebrations.

See also

 Moroccan cuisine
 Libyan cuisine
 Mauritanian cuisine
 Berber culture

References

African cuisine
Algerian cuisine
Libyan cuisine
Mediterranean cuisine
Moroccan cuisine
Mauritanian cuisine
North African cuisine
Tunisian cuisine
Berber cuisine
Berber culture